Zija Dizdarević (18 February 1916 – 1942) was a Bosnian prose writer.

Biography
He was born in Vitina, Ljubuški municipality, Bosnia and Herzegovina, Austria-Hungary to Bosniak parents Šefkija Dizdarević and Selima, from where he moved in 1920 to Fojnica. There he spent most of his youth and always came back regardless of all the other places he went to. After finishing primary school in Fojnica, he started grammar school in Sarajevo, and finished it in 1936. This is when his literary and political work started.

In those ages he managed to publish few short stories, and to get arrested for participating in youth strikes. In 1937 he started studying pedagogy at the University of Belgrade Faculty of Philosophy. His literary works started to appear in many papers, but also his political engagement rose. Even before he turned 30 the World War II started. For a year he worked in Fojnica and Sarajevo as illegal cooperator, thus in spring of 1942, one day before joining the partisan army he was arrested in Sarajevo and taken to Jasenovac concentration camp, where he was executed shortly afterwards.

List of works
All Dizdarević's works were published after his death. This is the list of titles and their first editions. List is in Serbo-Croatian, but possible translations into English are also given. There is no record that any of his works are translated into English until today.

Pripovijetke (Svjetlost, Sarajevo, 1948), Short Stories
Prosanjane jeseni (Džepna knjiga, Sarajevo, 1959), The Autumns That were Dreamt Away
Sabrana djela (Svjetlost, Sarajevo, 1968), Collected Works
Blago u duvaru (Zadrugar, Sarajevo, 1983), Treasure in the Wall

Adaptations

Dizdarević's story "Blago u duvaru" was adapted into film under the same name by Aleksandar Jevđević in 1975 for TV Sarajevo

References

1916 births
1942 deaths
Yugoslav writers
Bosniaks of Bosnia and Herzegovina
Bosnia and Herzegovina Muslims
People from Ljubuški
People from the Condominium of Bosnia and Herzegovina
Bosnia and Herzegovina writers
Bosniak writers
University of Belgrade Faculty of Philosophy alumni
People who died in Jasenovac concentration camp